The Pipe Nebula (also known as Barnard 59, 65–67, and 78) is a dark nebula in the Ophiuchus constellation and a part of the Dark Horse Nebula.  It is a large but readily apparent smoking pipe-shaped dust lane that obscures the Milky Way star clouds behind it.  Clearly visible to the naked eye in the Southern United States under clear dark skies, but it is best viewed with 7× binoculars.

The nebula has two main parts: the Pipe Stem with an opacity of 6 which is composed of Barnard 59, 65, 66, and 67 (also known as LDN 1773) 300′ x 60′ RA: 17h 21m Dec: −27° 23′; and the Bowl of the Pipe with an opacity of 5 which is composed of Barnard 78 (also known as LDN 42) 200′ x 140′ RA: 17h 33m Dec: −26° 30′.

Gallery

References

Dark nebulae
Barnard objects
Ophiuchus (constellation)